Bipinnatin J is a diterpene isolated from the bipinnate sea plume Antillogorgia bipinnata, a sea fan found in the eastern Caribbean Sea. It is one of the structurally simplest of the furanocembrenolides, and is speculated to be a biosynthetic precursor to a wide array cembrenolides along with the dehydroxylated analog, rubifolide.

Biosynthesis
Although the exact biosynthesis of bipinnatin J has not been formally studied, the biosynthesis the core cembrane skeleton, neo-cembrene, has been extensively studied. Starting from geranylgeranyl pyrophosphate, the pyrophosphate leaves, creating the allyl carbocation. A type A cyclization then yields the 14-membered cembrane ring with the isopropyl cation outside the ring. Proton elimination then yields neo-cembrene. From this point, the biosynthesis of bipinnatin J is speculative. Oxidation, most likely utilizing P450 monooxygenases, followed by ring closure creates both the furan and butenolide within the 14-membered ring. ∆ double bond isomerization of the C7-C8 olefin then occurs to afford the Z conformation, yielding rubifolide. Another oxidation of C2 then yields bipinnatin J.

References

Diterpenes